The 2000 Paris Masters was a men's tennis tournament played on indoor hard courts. It was the 28th edition of the Paris Masters, and was part of the ATP Masters Series of the 2000 ATP Tour. It took place at the Palais omnisports de Paris-Bercy in Paris, France, from 13 November through 20 November 2000. Second-seeded Marat Safin won the singles title.

Finals

Singles

 Marat Safin defeated  Mark Philippoussis 3–6, 7–6(9–7), 6–4, 3–6, 7–6(10–8)
 It was  Safin's 7th singles title of the year and the 8th of his career. It was his 2nd Masters Series title of the year, and overall.

Doubles

 Nicklas Kulti /  Max Mirnyi defeated  Paul Haarhuis /  Daniel Nestor 6–4, 7–5

References

External links
 Official website
 ATP tournament profile

 
Paris Masters
BNP Paribas Masters
BNP Paribas Masters
BNP Paribas Masters